"Body Talk" is a song by English singer and songwriter Foxes taken from her second studio album All I Need. The song was released in the United Kingdom on 24 July 2015 as the album's lead single. "Body Talk" swiftly returned Foxes to Scotland's & UK's Top 40 Singles Chart, scoring herself a 6th Top 40 hit.

Music video
In order to promote "Body Talk", Foxes released a music video on 22 June 2015, which was 3 minutes 28 seconds in length.

Track listing
Digital download
"Body Talk" – 3:29

Digital download – Remixes
"Body Talk" (Bakermat Remix) – 3:46
"Body Talk" (Bakermat Remix Instrumental) – 3:46
"Body Talk" (TCTS Remix) – 4:39
"Body Talk" (TCTS Remix Radio Edit) – 3:34
"Body Talk" (TCTS Extended Dub) – 4:03

Digital download – Live EP
"Body Talk" (Live at Google) – 3:23
"Feet Don't Fail Me Now" (Live at Google) – 3:19
"Holding onto Heaven" (Live at Google) – 3:26
"Let Go for Tonight" (Live at Google) – 3:14

Streaming – Live EP
"Body Talk" (Live at Google) – 3:23
"Feet Don't Fail Me Now" (Live at Google) – 3:19
"Holding onto Heaven" (Live at Google) – 3:26
"Youth" (Live at Google) – 2:53
"Let Go for Tonight" (Live at Google) – 3:14

Charts

Release history

References

2015 songs
2015 singles
Foxes (singer) songs
Songs written by Foxes (singer)
Songs written by Jim Eliot